The Supercopa de España Femenina or the Spanish Women's Super Cup is a super cup tournament in Spanish football, contested by the winners and runners up of the Copa de la Reina and the remaining highest ranked teams from the Primera División that had not already qualified through the cup final.

History
From 1997 to 2000, four editions of the Supercopa were played between the winners of the League and the Copa de la Reina, with San Vicente CFF winning its first edition, Atlético Málaga the second, Eibartarrak FT achieving the third edition and Levante (after absorbing San Vicente) winning the last.

The competition was re-instated in December 2019 by the Royal Spanish Football Federation with the same format as the established for the 2019–20 men's tournament.

Finals by year

Two-team format

Four-team format

See also
 Football in Spain

References

 
Spa
Women's football competitions in Spain
Reina